Oorim (also Romanized as Owrīm and Ūrīm) is a village in Rastupey Rural District, in the Central District of Savadkuh County, Mazandaran Province, Iran. At the 2006 census, its population was 118, in 31 families.

References 

Populated places in Savadkuh County